Henri Lodewijk George "Ody" Koopman (19 July 1902 – 20 May 1949) was a Dutch tennis player.

Career 
Koopman was four times Dutch champion. In 1930 he won the title in the mixed doubles with Mence Canters. In 1931, 1932 (both with Joop Knottenbelt and in 1933 (with Hendrik Timmer) he won the gentlemen's double. He competed in 1931 and 1934 at the Wimbledon tournament. In 1931 he reached the third round at Wimbledon, losing to Cam Malfroy of New Zealand 5–7, 3–6, 4–6.

Koopman was a member of the Dutch Davis Cup team in the days of the Dutch champion Henk Timmer.

Private life and death 
Koopman was born in Salatiga, Dutch East Indies. His younger sister was Toto Koopman. He was married twice and had two sons in his second marriage.

Although not divorced from his second wife, in 1949 Koopman lived with a girlfriend and their baby in Ascona, Switzerland. In May of that year his girlfriend was found murdered and Koopman was missing. He was tracked down and arrested a week later, and died a couple of days later of 'total exhaustion' in a mental institute in Mendrisio.

References

1902 births
1949 deaths
Dutch male tennis players
People from Salatiga
20th-century Dutch people